Phosphor bands were introduced on British stamps from 1959 as a replacement for the previous graphite lined stamps as an aid in the mechanical sorting of mail.

The phosphor is applied in vertical bands, or more recently, all over the stamp, and fluoresces under ultra-violet light. This enables the mail sorting machine to face the mail and sort it into types.

Phosphor is now widely used on stamps around the world. It is necessary to use either a short- or long-wave ultraviolet lamp to view the phosphor, according to the type of phosphor used on the stamp.

External links 
Phosphor and British Machin stamps.
Simple explanation for viewing phosphor bands on UK stamps.

Postage stamps of the United Kingdom
Postal system of the United Kingdom
Philatelic terminology